Penguin District School is a public, co-educational high school, in Penguin, Tasmania, Australia, a town located midway between of Burnie and Ulverstone. It was created in 2013 when Penguin High School merged with Penguin Primary School. Beginning in 2019, Penguin added grade 11 and 12 classes, mainly revolving around sports-based classes. This sports focus was boosted with the opening of Dial Park, a multi-football ground sports complex on par with UTAS and Blundstone arenas.

See also 
 List of schools in Tasmania
 Education in Tasmania

References

Public district schools in Tasmania
2013 establishments in Australia
Educational institutions established in 2013